Mutya ng Pilipinas 2007, the 39th edition of Mutya ng Pilipinas, Inc., was held on June 22, 2007 in Subic Bay, Zambales. Zephora Mayon, the winner of Mutya ng Pilipinas Asia Pacific Int'l (Intercontinental) 2007 and Ana Marie Morelos named as Mutya ng Pilipinas Tourism International 2007.

Results
Color keys

Special Title

Special Awards

Contestants

Crossovers from Major National Pageants prior to this date
 Mutya #11 Istana Eula Olay Burgos was Miss Philippines Earth 2005 candidate
 Mutya #13 Anna Katrina Raquindin Bautista was Miss Philippines Earth 2007 Miss Eco-Tourism / 4th runner-up
 Mutya #14 Ricamarie Anne Beltran Taylor was Binibining Pilipinas 2005 Top 11 semifinalist and Binibining Pilipinas 2007 candidate
 Mutya #27 Mary Jane delos Santos dela Cruz was Binibining Pilipinas 2005 candidate
 Mutya #17 Angelee delos Reyes is Miss Philippines Earth 2013

Post-Pageant Notes

 Mutya ng Pilipinas Asia Pacific Int'l (Intercontinental), Zephora Mayon abdicated her title and was replaced by Ana Marie Morelos, her co-winner who was Mutya ng Pilipinas Tourism International 2007. The Philippines was not represented at Miss Intercontinental 2007 pageant
 Mutya ng Pilipinas Tourism Int'l, Ana Marie Morelos competed at Miss Tourism Metropolitan International 2007 in Kuala Lumpur, Malaysia and placed 4th runner-up
 Mutya #17, Angelee delos Reyes was crowned Miss Philippines Earth 2013 and eventually landed Miss Earth 2013 Top 8 finalist

References

External links
 Official Mutya ng Pilipinas website
  Mutya ng Pilipinas 2008 is on!

2007 beauty pageants
2007 in the Philippines
2007